, stylized as , is a Japanese singer and songwriter from Osaka Prefecture who is signed to NBCUniversal Entertainment Japan. After becoming interested with music in her childhood, she began singing and writing original songs. In 2006, she began uploading her music to Niconico and other websites, gaining the attention of the J-pop band Supercell, who featured Yanagi as the guest vocalist from 2009 to 2011.

Yanagi made her solo debut in February 2012 with the release of the single "Vidro Moyō", which is used as the ending theme to the anime Waiting in the Summer. Her music has been featured in anime series such as My Youth Romantic Comedy Is Wrong, As I Expected, Jormungand, Seraph of the End, and Nagi-Asu: A Lull in the Sea. She has also performed at overseas events in Southeast Asia, China, and Europe. In 2012, Yanagi collaborated with composer Jun Maeda of Key to produce the original concept album Owari no Hoshi no Love Song, which finished 6th on the Oricon charts, marking her first album to chart.

Yanagi has written the songs for 2014's Kamigami no Asobi, and performed the theme songs for The Quintessential Quintuplets in 2019, 2021, and 2022. Aside from singing and songwriting, Yanagi served as the music producer of the 2017 anime series Just Because!. She announced her marriage on her official blog on August 5, 2019.

Early life
Yanagi was born in Osaka Prefecture on May 31, 1987. From an early age, she had become interested in music, playing with an electronic keyboard her neighbor originally intended to throw away. She also sang to nursery rhymes, making up tunes as she saw fit. When she was in junior high school, her brother bought computer programs used for producing music, which she decided to experiment on. During her junior high school years, because of her belief that "her voice was mediocre", she decided to make music instead.

Career

2006–2011: Early career and Supercell
Yanagi began posting cover versions of songs online in 2006, and started producing original dōjin music under the name CorLeonis. Leonis was only released online via Yanagi's website. Two more releases followed in 2011: the single  and the best of album . In May 2006, she formed the music duo Binaria with female singer Annabel. Between 2007 and 2011, Binaria released two mini-albums (Alhaja (2007) and Forma (2007)), one best of album (Sonido (2010)), and four singles ("Epoca" (2008), "Alba" (2009), "Delightful Doomsday" (2010), and "Nachtflug" (2011)). Binaria also collaborated with the singer Cassini for the single "Rueda" (2007). In January 2007, Yanagi formed the musical unit Inochi Kokonotsu with composer KTG (an acronym of Ken The Garage), and the group put out a single album, on April 29, 2007 before disbanding in June 2007.

As early as 2007, Yanagi began submitting cover versions of songs to the Nico Nico Douga video sharing website under the name Gazelle. Roughly the next day after Supercell's songwriter Ryo uploaded the music group's first song "Melt" in December 2007, Yanagi uploaded a cover of her singing the song. Yanagi, who was herself a fan of Ryo's music, contacted him and the two talked about someday collaborating. Ryo, who had been a fan of Yanagi's voice even before uploading his own songs to Nico Nico Douga, approached her to sing the vocals for Supercell's debut single "Kimi no Shiranai Monogatari" (2009). Yanagi continued as the vocalist of Supercell until 2011, and in that time provided vocals for two more singles in 2010—"Sayonara Memories" and "Utakata Hanabi / Hoshi ga Matataku Konna Yoru ni"—and Supercell's second studio album Today Is A Beautiful Day (2011). Later in 2011, Yanagi sang two songs on the original soundtrack for Key's visual novel Rewrite.

2012–2016: Solo debut
Yanagi collaborated with Jun Maeda of Key to produce the original concept album Owari no Hoshi no Love Song released on April 25, 2012. A single from the album, "Killer Song", was released at Comiket 81 on December 29, 2011. Yanagi made her solo debut signed to Geneon with the single  released on February 29, 2012. "Vidro Moyō" is used as the ending theme to the 2012 anime series Waiting in the Summer. Yanagi's second single "Ambivalentidea" was released on June 6, 2012; the title track is used as the ending theme to the 2012 anime series Jormungand. Her third single  was released on November 7, 2012; the title track is used as the ending theme to Jormungands second season Jormungand: Perfect Order.

Yanagi released her fourth single "Zoetrope" on January 30, 2013; the title track is used as the opening theme to the 2013 anime series Amnesia. Yanagi released her fifth single  on April 17, 2013; the song is used as the opening theme to the 2013 anime series My Youth Romantic Comedy Is Wrong, As I Expected. Yanagi's solo debut album  was released on July 3, 2013. Yanagi released her sixth single  on November 20, 2013; the song is used as the first ending theme to the 2013 anime series Nagi-Asu: A Lull in the Sea. Her seventh single  was released on February 19, 2014; the song is used as the second ending theme to Nagi-Asu. Yanagi's eighth single  was released on June 4, 2014; the song is used as the ending theme to the 2014 anime series Black Bullet. The third song of the single is used in the Z-kai Group promotion video  in collaboration with Makoto Shinkai. She made an appearance at Anime Festival Asia Singapore in November 2014.

Yanagi's second solo album  was released on December 10, 2014. Her ninth single "Sweet Track" was released on December 24, 2014. Her tenth single "Foe" was released on March 18, 2015. Yanagi's 11th single  was released on June 3, 2015; the song is used as the opening theme to the second season of My Youth Romantic Comedy Is Wrong, As I Expected. In July 2015, she made appearances at Japan Expo in Paris and Hyper Japan in London. She also made an appearance at SMASH! in Sydney in August 2015, and later at Anime Festival Asia Indonesia in September 2015. Her 12th single  was released on December 9, 2015; the song is used as the ending theme to the 2015 anime series Seraph of The End: Battle in Nagoya. Her 13th single  was released on February 24, 2016; the song is used as the opening theme to the 2016 anime series Norn9; Yanagi also played the role of Aion in the series. Yanagi's third solo album Follow My Tracks was released on April 20, 2016. Yanagi's 14th single  was released on August 31, 2016; the song is used as the ending theme to the 2016 anime series Berserk. She appeared at Animax Carnival Malaysia in March 2016, and at Animax Carnival Philippines in October 2016.

2017–present: Professional expansion 
Yanagi collaborated with Yoshino Nanjō in performing the song  released on May 17, 2017; the song is used as the ending theme to the second season of Berserk. Her 15th single  was released on August 2, 2017; the song is used as the ending theme for the 2017 anime series Chronos Ruler. Yanagi's 16th single "Over and Over" was released on November 1, 2017; the song was used as the opening theme for the 2017 anime series Just Because!, where she also served as the music producer. Her 17th single "Here and There /  was released on November 1, 2017; "Here and There" and "Satōdama no Tsuki" was used as the opening and ending themes to the 2017 anime television series Kino's Journey – The Beautiful World.

Yanagi's fourth solo album  was released on January 17, 2018. Her 18th single  was released on February 21, 2018; the song is used as the first ending theme to the 2018 anime series Hakyū Hōshin Engi. Her 19th single  was released on May 30, 2018; the song is used as the second ending theme to Hakyū Hōshin Engi. Her 20th single  was released on October 31, 2018; the song is used as the ending theme to 2018 anime series Iroduku: The World in Colors. She was released two compilation albums titled Yanagi Nagi Best Album -Library- and Yanagi Nagi Best Album -Museum- on January 9, 2019. In August 2019, she performed in North America for the first time at Anime Revolution in Vancouver.

Her 21st single  was released on February 19, 2020; the song is used as the opening theme song to anime series The Case Files of Jeweler Richard. Her 22nd single  was released on July 15, 2020; the song is used as the opening theme song to the third season of My Youth Romantic Comedy Is Wrong, As I Expected. Her 23rd single  / "Goodbye Seven Seas" was released on October 28, 2020; "Kimi to Iu Shinwa" and "Goodbye Seven Seas" were used as the opening and ending themes to the 2020 anime television series The Day I Became a God. Her 24th single  was released on November 3, 2021; the song is used as the ending theme song to the first season of the anime series The Faraway Paladin.

In the making of the second season of The Quintessential Quintuplets, Yanagi wrote the songs that were performed by the Nanako quintuplets because she wanted to be more creative in songwriting although there was a COVID-19 pandemic.

Artistry

Influences 
Yanagi cites Akino Arai, Yoko Kanno, and Maaya Sakamoto as well as the 1996 song "Flower Crown" by the musical unit Goddess in the Morning as some of her musical influences; early on, she decided that she wanted to write music "just like Arai". In an interview with Japanese website Natalie, she describes how desktop music software was magical for her, as it allowed her to make music without playing instruments. She later bought an audio interface for the software to allow her to experiment more.

Musical style 
In an interview with Animate Times, Yanagi discussed her experiences in making the single "Ambivalentidea", as well as her early career. She describes how she originally did not intend to pursue a career in music, as producing dōjin music was just a hobby and she was working at a non-music related job. She started out performing covers of songs, but due to positive reception online, she was persuaded to make original songs as well. For the single "Ambivalentidea", she wanted to incorporate Jormungands theme of "contradiction" in the song. To accomplish this, she included figurative and abstract words in the song's lyrics. The song's title comes from the words ambivalent and idea, which when put together were intended to express the idea of a contradiction of visualization. In an interview with Natalie, she described how because she wanted the song to have a "more literary feel", she would frequently consult a dictionary while writing the lyrics.

In an interview with Entertainment Station, Yanagi discussed her role as music producer of the anime series Just Because!, and the making of the series' opening theme "Over and Over". It was the first time that she served as a music producer for an anime series, so she would discuss ideas with anime staff. As Just Because! is set in a high school, she set out to write music that would fit scenes, deciding when instruments such as the piano or guitar would be used depending on the scene. She used picture stories as references in making the soundtrack; she also used high school baseball cheering songs as references in writing a track for scenes involving baseball. The intro of "Over and Over" was influenced by two of her earlier songs "Yukitoki" and "Harumodoki", which were both used in My Youth Romantic Comedy Is Wrong, As I Expected. For the song, she wanted to incorporate the series plot point of transferring schools; she aimed for the song to have a happy feeling, but she took time finding a way to express it.

Filmography

Anime

Video games

Discography

Albums

Studio albums

Compilation albums

Singles

Digital singles

Collaborations

Other album appearances

Notes

References

External links
  
 

1987 births
Living people
Japanese women pop singers
Musicians from Osaka Prefecture
NBCUniversal Entertainment Japan artists
Anime musicians
21st-century Japanese singers
21st-century Japanese women singers
Utaite